Burkal is the name of a small village in the Aabenraa Municipality, south Jutland, Denmark. 

Villages in Denmark
Aabenraa Municipality